Slurry transport uses several methods: hydraulic conveying; conventional lean slurry conveying; and high concentration slurry disposal (HCSD).  The latter, HCSD, is a relatively modern approach, which is used to transfer high throughputs of fine fly ash over long distances (>) using high pressure diaphragm pumps with velocities of around 2 m/s. Ash disposal is simple as the ash solidifies easily and the system does not produce the waste water or leachate problems which can often be associated with ash lagoons.

Examples
Typical HCSD systems include the Clyde Bergemann solution designed to reduce water usage (up to 90% by weight), reduce ground and surface water pollution, reduce dust emission surrounding landfill site, increase disposal area working capacity and lower energy consumption.

See also
High-density solids pump

References

2: Miedema, S.A., Slurry Transport: Fundamentals, a Historical Overview and The Delft Head Loss & Limit Deposit Velocity Framework. http://www.dredging.org/media/ceda/org/documents/resources/othersonline/miedema-2016-slurry-transport.pdf

External links
 CASE STUDY: Modern materials handling solution installed at Eraring power plant, Australia

Waste treatment technology